Elod Macskasy (7 April 1919 – 21 January 1990) was a Hungarian-Canadian chess master. He was a mathematics professor, and also competed in swimming for Hungary at the 1936 Berlin Olympics.

Early life and education
Elod Macskasy was born in Arad, which at the time was part of the Kingdom of Hungary, but was shortly afterwards ceded to Romania by the Treaty of Trianon. He completed his early schooling there, and at the age of 16 won the chess championship of the city.

He studied mathematics in Budapest from 1937 to 1942, at the Pázmány Péter University, earning his doctorate. During this time, he competed with some success in team and student chess tournaments.

Macskasy scored 1/1 on the first reserve board for Hungary at the 2nd Balkaniad, Sofia 1947, and his team won the gold medals. In 1947, he gained the Hungarian National Master title following his performance in the 1947 Hungarian championship. Perhaps his best Hungarian result occurred in 1952, when he won a Master tournament ahead of Árpád Vajda, István Bilek and Károly Honfi.

Macskasy co-authored a book on the 1952 Hungarian championship.

Life in Canada
Following the Hungarian Revolution of 1956, he emigrated to Canada, where he secured a position as professor of mathematics at the University of British Columbia in Vancouver.

He was a surprise winner of the 1958 Canadian Open championship, at Winnipeg, ahead of Grandmaster Larry Evans, with 9/10.  Macskasy won the British Columbia Championship for five straight years, from 1958 to 1962, and shared this title in 1967. He continued to play often in this event, generally scoring well, into the late 1980s.

In 1961, he played an eight-game match with Daniel Yanofsky, Canada's top player, in Vancouver, losing by (+2 =1 -5); the match assisted Yanofsky's preparation for the 1962 Interzonal.

Macskasy competed several times in the Canadian Chess Championship, generally with good results. At Brockville 1961, he tied for 5-6th, with 6/11. At Winnipeg 1963, he was third, with 10/15. At Vancouver 1965, he finished tied 4-5th, with 6.5/11. At Toronto 1972, he scored 8.5/17 for a tied 12-13th. At Calgary 1975, at age 56, he struggled with 5/15 for a shared 12-13th.

In the early 1960s, he had a Canadian Chess Federation rating of 2400, indicating a player of International Master strength, however, he was never awarded a title by FIDE. Macskasy served as co-editor of the magazine Canadian Chess Chat for many years from the late 1950s.

Macskasy represented Canada twice at Chess Olympiads: 1964 at Tel Aviv on board 4: 5/13 (+3 = 4 -6); 1968 at Lugano on board 3: 6.5/13 (+4 =5 -4). He remained a strong player throughout his life, maintaining a rating of over 2200 until his last tournament, the 1989 Paul Keres memorial in Vancouver.

Macskasy died unexpectedly on 21 January 1990, at age 70.

References

External links

1919 births
1990 deaths
20th-century Hungarian mathematicians
20th-century chess players
Canadian chess players
Canadian chess writers
Canadian mathematicians
Chess Olympiad competitors
Eötvös Loránd University alumni
Hungarian chess players
Hungarian chess writers
Hungarian emigrants to Canada
Hungarian refugees
Olympic swimmers of Hungary
People from Arad, Romania
Swimmers from Vancouver
Academic staff of the University of British Columbia
Writers from Vancouver